Major Trends in Jewish Mysticism is a work on the history of the Jewish Kabbalah by Gershom Scholem, published in 1941.

Topics
In his introduction to Major Trends in Jewish Mysticism, Scholem blames Jewish scholars of the Haskalah period, who, because of what he decried their antagonism and neglect of the study of Kabbalah, allowed the field be all but monopolized by "charlatans and dreamers".

Scholem's chapter on Merkabah mysticism and Jewish gnosticism deals mainly with the mystical books the Lesser Hechalot and the Greater Hechalot, tracts written and edited between the 2nd and 6th centuries C.E. Scholem also writes on other tracts like Shiur Koma, the Book of Enoch, Sefer Yetzira and the Sefer Habahir.

In the book, Scholem, citing other scholars, observed similarities between the Sefer Yetzirah (Book of Creation) and early Islamic gnosticism.

Scholem subsequently explores the works of the German Jewish school of Hasidim, and of the works of Abraham Abulafia. Next, the most detailed investigation in Scholem's work is on the best known work of Jewish mysticism, the Zohar. After that, Scholem explores Isaac Luria's teachings, Sabbatai Zevi and the Eastern European Hasidic movement.

Commemoration
On the 50th anniversary of the book's publication, a conference of scholars convened in Berlin in Scholem's honor.

See also
 Gershom Scholem

References

1941 books
Books by Gershom Scholem